Josef Ichhäuser(1852–1920), known by the stage name Josef Josephi (also spelled Joseffy), was a Polish-born singer (tenor-baritone) and actor.

Life 

He was the son of a cloth merchant. He graduated from high school in 1871 and made his debut in 1873 in Vienna in a small role as a soldier in Friedrich Schiller’s Fiesco. His apprenticeship led him to Nagykanizsa, Chemnitz and Wrocław. In 1878 he joined the Ringtheater in Vienna. In 1880 he played at the Carltheater, and in 1883 at the Theater an der Wien.

Successes in performing vocal roles led him to the decision to become a singer.

He sang in Johann Strauss II's Eine Nacht in Venedig and The Gypsy Baron, and in Vilém Blodek's comic one-act opera  (In the Well).

In 1900 he moved to Berlin.

He stood for the last time on the stage on New Year's Eve, 1919.

Main roles 

Jan Janicki in Der Bettelstudent by Carl Millöcker (1882)
Guido in Eine Nacht in Venedig by Johann Strauss II (1883)
Conte Erminio in Gasparone by Carl Millöcker (1884)
Botho von Wendt in Waldmeister by Johann Strauss II (1895)

References 

1852 births
1920 deaths
Male actors from Kraków
Polish operatic tenors